C. cuspidata may refer to:
 Castanopsis cuspidata , a tree species native to southern Japan and southern Korea
 Cyathea cuspidata, a tree fern species native to Central and South America

See also
 Cuspidata (disambiguation)